Lucien is a French restaurant located at 14 1st Avenue in New York City. Lucien was opened by Moroccan-born restauranteur Lucien Bahaj in 1998. The menu includes traditional French fare inspired by Bahaj's upbringing in the South of France. 

Its clientele have included established celebrities through promotional collaboration with New York publicist Kaitlin Phillips; she has brought celebrities like Bella Hadid and Chloe Sevigny, and New York artists Jonas Mekas and Dash Snow, to the restaurant.

Bahaj passed away in 2019, and today the restaurant's operations are handled by his son Zac.

References

External links

Restaurants in Manhattan
Restaurants established in 1998